The women's coxless pairs rowing competition at the 1980 Summer Olympics took place at the Krylatskoye Rowing Canal, Moscow, Soviet Union. The event was held from 21 to 26 July.

Heats 
The fastest team in each heat advanced to the final. The remaining teams had to compete in the repechage for the remaining spots in the final.

Heat 1

Heat 2

Repechage 
Three fastest teams in the repechage advanced to the final.

Final

References

Sources

Rowing at the 1980 Summer Olympics
Women's rowing at the 1980 Summer Olympics